Lotta Linnea Ökvist (born 17 February 1997) is a Swedish professional footballer who plays as a defender for BK Häcken in the Damallsvenskan and the Sweden national team.

She previously played for Swedish clubs Hammarby IF, Piteå IF and Umeå IK, and Manchester United in the FA WSL.

Club career

Move to the U.S.
After spending time with Piteå IF and Umeå IK in her native Sweden, Ökvist signed with NWSL team Boston Breakers in October 2017 ahead of the 2018 season.  However, prior to the beginning of the season, the Boston Breakers folded and Ökvist was selected by the Houston Dash as the 13th pick in the resultant dispersal draft on 7 March 2018. Two weeks later, Ökvist was traded to the Orlando Pride in exchange for Orlando's third-round pick in the 2019 NWSL College Draft. On 3 July 2018, the Orlando Pride announced that they had released Ökvist, allowing her to pursue opportunities in Europe. Ökvist never appeared in a game for the Pride.

Return to Sweden
On 4 July 2018, Hammarby IF of the Damallsvenskan in Sweden announced they had signed Ökvist for the remainder of the 2018 season. The team was relegated to the Elitettan. Ökvist remained with Hammarby through 2019, starting every Elitettan match prior to her departure in August.

Manchester United
On 20 August 2019, Ökvist signed for Manchester United in the English FA WSL. Ökvist made her debut for Manchester United against Manchester City in the FA WSL on 7 September 2019, a 1–0 loss in the inaugural Manchester derby.

BK Häcken
On 14 January 2021, reigning Swedish champions Kopparbergs/Göteborg FC (renamed BK Häcken ahead of the 2021 season) announced they had signed Ökvist from Manchester United on a two-year deal. She made her debut on 13 March starting in the first game of the season, a 1–0 win over Växjö DFF in the Svenska Cupen.

International career
Ökvist has represented Sweden at under-17, under-19, and under-23 levels. In 2015, she helped Sweden win the UEFA Women's Under-19 Championship.

In March 2020, Ökvist was called up to the senior Sweden national team for the first time to compete at the 2020 Algarve Cup. She made her senior international debut on 7 March, starting in the second game of the tournament against Denmark.

Career statistics

Club

Honours
International
UEFA Women's Under-19 Championship: 2015

References

External links
 Profile at the Manchester United F.C. website
 
 

1997 births
Living people
Orlando Pride players
Swedish women's footballers
Sweden women's international footballers
Women's association football defenders
Damallsvenskan players
Hammarby Fotboll (women) players
Piteå IF (women) players
Umeå IK players
People from Piteå
Manchester United W.F.C. players
Women's Super League players
Swedish expatriate sportspeople in England
Expatriate women's footballers in England
Sportspeople from Norrbotten County